Gustavo Antonio Varela Rodríguez (born 14 May 1978) is a Uruguayan former footballer. He was a versatile right sided player who also could "be played as a lone striker, behind the front two" or at the heart of midfield.

Career 
Varela started his career in Nacional in Uruguay, and played between 2002 and 2008 for FC Schalke 04 in Germany. After his contract with Schalke 04 expired in January 2009, Varela returned to Nacional.

Varela transferred to Argentina to play for recently promoted Quilmes in the 2010–11 Argentine Primera División season.

International career 
Varela made 24 appearances for the Uruguay national football team, and was a participant at the 2002 FIFA World Cup.

Honours 
Schalke 04
UEFA Intertoto Cup: 2003
DFB-Ligapokal: 2005

References

External links 
 
 
 

Living people
1978 births
Association football midfielders
Uruguayan footballers
Club Nacional de Football players
FC Schalke 04 players
Quilmes Atlético Club footballers
C.A. Cerro players
Uruguay international footballers
2002 FIFA World Cup players
2004 Copa América players
Uruguayan Primera División players
Bundesliga players
Argentine Primera División players
Expatriate footballers in Germany
Expatriate footballers in Argentina
Uruguayan expatriate footballers